Kairatu is a small town and kecamatan on the southwestern coast of the Indonesian island of Seram.  According to the 2010 census, the district had a population of 54,866 people, but the district has subsequently been split and the reduced area (now 329.65 km2) had 27,040 inhabitants at the 2020 Census.

References

Populated places in Seram Island
Central Maluku Regency